Jaigad Port or Jaigarh is a sea port in Maharashtra, India, on the eastern coast of the Arabian Sea. The port is operated by JSW Infrastructure. It is Maharashtra's first deep water and all-weather port for berthing of capsized ships. The port offers specialised services for dry bulk and liquid cargo.

Background
JSW Energy started construction of a 1200 MW thermal power plant (known as the Ratnagiri Power Plant) at Jaigad in the Ratnagiri district, Maharashtra, in the early 2000s. The thermal power plant was commissioned in 2007. The Jaigad port (JSW) was established in 2006 to support the coal import requirements directly adjacent to the thermal power plant. The port was officially inaugurated in August 2009. All of the coal for JSW Energy thermal power plant is supplied by Jaigad Port.

Operations
The total quay length is 1.91 kilometres (18.54 mi), and the depths 18.5 meters. These characteristics are comparable with those offered by the most important international ports, allowing the accommodation of tankers with a capacity of 3,40,000 tonnes deadweight (DWT) and bulkcarriers of 2,00,000 DWT.

Statistics
In the fiscal year 2019, Jaigad Port handled  of cargo.

References

External links
Official site

Ports and harbours of Maharashtra
Economy of Maharashtra